Mario Tronti (born 24 July 1931 in Rome) is an Italian philosopher and politician, considered one of the founders of the theory of operaismo in the 1960s.

An active member of the Italian Communist Party (PCI) during the 1950s, he was, with Raniero Panzieri, amongst the founders of the Quaderni Rossi (Red Notebooks) review from which he split in 1963 to found the Classe Operaia (Working Class) review. This evolving journey progressively distanced him from the PCI, without ever formally leaving, and engaged him in the radical experiences of operaismo. Such experience, considered by many to be the matrix of Italian Autonomist Marxism in the 1960s, was characterised by challenging the roles of the traditional organisations of the workers' movement (the unions and the parties) and the direct engagement, without intermediaries, with the working class itself and to the struggles in the factories.

Influenced philosophically by the work of Galvano Della Volpe, which led him to distance himself from the thinking of Antonio Gramsci, or at least the official version promulgated by the PCI, Tronti dedicated himself to the formulation of a politics, basing theory on practice, which could renew traditional Marxism and contribute to re-opening the revolutionary road in the West.

Faced with mass revolt by Western workers in the 1960s, Tronti's operaismo was able to propose a modern analysis of class relations and above all refocus attention of the subjective factor, claiming the central political role of the working class. His ideas found an echo in 1966, with the publication of Operai e capitale (Workers and Capital), a book which would exercise a notable influence on the protests of the youth and, more generally, on the wave of mobilisation that was initiated in the following years.

Publications 
Tra materialismo dialettico e filosofia della prassi. Gramsci e Labriola, in A. Caracciolo et G. Scalia (éd.), La città futura. Saggi sulla figura e il pensiero di Antonio Gramsci, Feltrinelli, Milano, 1959
(éd.), Scritti inediti di economia politica di Marx, Editori Riuniti, Roma, 1963
Baldi, Camillo, in A.M. Ghisalberti (éd.), Dizionario Biografico degli Italiani 5, Istituto dell'Enciclopedia Italiana, Roma, 1963
Operai e capitale, Einaudi, Torino, 1966 (DeriveApprodi, Roma, 2006)
Hegel politico, Istituto dell'Enciclopedia italiana, Roma, 1975
Sull'autonomia del politico, Feltrinelli, Milano, 1977
Stato e rivoluzione in Inghilterra, Il Saggiatore, Milano, 1977
(en collab. avec G. Napolitano, A. Accornero et M. Cacciari), Operaismo e centralità operaia, Editori Riuniti, Roma, 1978
(éd.), Il politico. Antologia di testi del pensiero politico. 1 : Da Machiavelli a Cromwell, Feltrinelli, Milano, 1979
Soggetti, crisi, potere, A. Piazzi et A. De Martinis (éd.), Cappelli, Bologna, 1980 ;
Il tempo della politica, Editori Riuniti, Roma, 1980
Con le spalle al futuro. Per un altro dizionario politico, Editori Riuniti, Roma, 1992 ;
Berlinguer. Il Principe disarmato, Edizioni Sisifo, Roma, 1994
La politica al tramonto, Einaudi, Torino, 1998
Rileggendo "La libertà comunista", in G. Liguori (éd.), Galvano Della Volpe. Un altro marxismo, Edizioni Fahrenheit 451, Roma, 2000
(éd. avec P. Favilli), Classe operaia. Le identità : storia e prospettiva, Angeli, Milano, 2001
Cenni di Castella, Edizioni Cadmo, Fiesole, 2001
Per la critica della democrazia politica, in M. Tari (éd.), Guerra e democrazia, ManifestoLibri, Roma, 2005
Id. et al., Politica e destino, Sossella editore, Roma, 2006 (avec les contributions de divers auteurs sur la pensée de Mario Tronti)

References 
Alcaro M., Dellavolpismo e nuova sinistra, Dedalo, Bari, 1977 ;
Basso C., Gozzini C. et Sguazzino D. (éd.), Bibliografia delle opere e degli scritti di Mario Tronti, Dipartimento di Filosofia-Università degli Studi di Siena, Sienne, 2001 ;
Berardinelli A., Stili dell'estremismo. Critica del pensiero essenziale, Editori Riuniti, Roma, 2001 ;
Borio G., Pozzi F., Roggero G., Futuro anteriore : dai Quaderni rossi ai movimenti globali. Ricchezze e limiti dell'operaismo italiano, DeriveApprodi, Rome, 2002 ;
Leo R., "Per una storia di Classe Operaia", dans la revue Bailamme, n° 26, giugno 2000 ;
Gobbi R., Com'eri bella, classe operaia. Storia fatti e misfatti dell'operaismo italiano, Longanesi, Milano, 1989 ;
Mezzadra S., Operaismo, in R. Esposito et C. Galli (éd.), Enciclopedia del pensiero politico. Autori, concetti, dottrine, Laterza, Roma-Bari, 2000 ;
Peduzzi A., Lo spirito della politica e il suo destino. L'autonomia del politico, il suo tempo, Ediesse-Crs, Roma, 2006 ;
Preve C., La teoria in pezzi. La dissoluzione del paradigma teorico operaista, Dedalo, Bari, 1984 ;
Turchetto M., De l'ouvrier masse à l'entrepreneurialité commune : la trajectoire déconcertante de l'opéraïsme italien, in J. Bidet et E, Kouvélakis (éd.), Dictionnaire Marx contemporain, PUF, Paris, 2001 ;
Wright S., Storming Heaven. Class Composition and Struggle in Italian Autonomist Marxism, Pluto Press, London, 2002.
 Michele Filippini, Leaping Forward. Mario Tronti and the History of Political Workerism (Jan Van Eyck Academie )
Anastasi, A., The Weapon of Organisation: Mario Tronti's Political Revolution in Marxism. Common Notions. 2020. 
Vocations of the Political: Mario Tronti and Max Weber - CRMEP BOOKS 3 (ed. Howard Caygill). 2021. Available Free Online.

External links 
 L'intégralité de l'ouvrage Ouvriers et Capital avec suppléments, sur le site de Multitudes.
  "Storia e critica del concetto di democrazia" (intervention de M. Tronti, 29 January 2005), disponible aussi en fichier audio
  Site web italien pour la philosophie : Mario Tronti
  Conricerca-Futuro Anteriore
  Class Against Class (avec des textes de Tronti en anglais)
  "Antagonism and Insurrection in Italian "Operaismo"" (article de A. Toscano)
  "Lotta contro gli idoli" (intervention de M. Tronti pour Rai Educational, 27 February 2001)
 "Laboratorio Tronti"
"The young Mario Tronti" - a dossier on, and collection of, some of Tronti's early writings (introduction by Andrew Anastasi)

Labor studies scholars
1931 births
Living people
21st-century Italian philosophers
20th-century Italian philosophers
Italian magazine founders